Zheng Yuli (born 1963) is a retired female badminton player from China.

Career
She earned a bronze medal as a semifinalist at both the 1985 IBF World Championships and 1987 IBF World Championships in women's singles, dropping three set matches in each case to her compatriots Han Aiping and Li Lingwei respectively. She won women's singles at the Japan Open in 1984 and at the Denmark Open in 1984 and 1986. Zheng played on Uber Cup (women's international) championship teams for China in 1986 and 1988.

Since retiring from international competitions, Yuli has been living in Perth, Western Australia. She runs the An-Yu Badminton Academy.

Achievements

World Championships 
Women's singles

World Cup 
Women's singles

Asian Championships 
Women's singles

Women's doubles

Open tournaments 
Women's singles

IBF Grand Prix 
The World Badminton Grand Prix sanctioned by International Badminton Federation (IBF) from 1983 to 2006.

Women's singles

Women's doubles

External links
 Profile

Chinese female badminton players
Living people
20th-century births
Asian Games medalists in badminton
Badminton players at the 1986 Asian Games
Badminton players from Shanghai
Asian Games gold medalists for China
Medalists at the 1986 Asian Games
Year of birth missing (living people)